Cory Sandhagen (born April 20, 1992) is an American professional mixed martial artist. He currently competes in the Bantamweight division in the Ultimate Fighting Championship (UFC). A professional competitor since 2015, Sandhagen has also competed for Legacy Fighting Alliance. As of December 6, 2022, he is #5 in the UFC bantamweight rankings.

Background
Born and raised in Aurora, Colorado, Sandhagen attended Smoky Hill High School where he was on the basketball team – a sport he had been playing from his youth. Eventually he grew interest in combat sports, first picking up kickboxing in which he won multiple WKA titles. After winning a WKA world title, Sandhagen began transitioning to mixed martial arts.

Sandhagen attended University of Colorado Boulder, from where he graduated with a degree in psychology.

Mixed martial arts career

Early career
Sandhagen made his Legacy Fighting Alliance debut on February 24, 2017 at LFA 5 against Jamall Emmers, losing the bout via unanimous decision. His next fight was on October 17, 2017 against Luiz Antonio Lobo Gavinho at LFA 24, which he won via first round TKO. Sandhagen's final appearance for Legacy Fighting Alliance came on January 19, 2018 at LFA 31, defeating Jose Aguayo via first round TKO.

Ultimate Fighting Championship
Sandhagen made his promotional debut at UFC on Fox: Jacaré vs. Brunson 2 on January 27, 2018 against Austin Arnett. He won the fight via second-round TKO.

His next bout was at UFC Fight Night: Gaethje vs. Vick on August 25, 2018 Iuri Alcantara. After a back-and-forth affair, he won the fight via second-round TKO. This fight earned him the Fight of the Night award.

Sandhagen was scheduled to face Thomas Almeida at UFC Fight Night: Cejudo vs. Dillashaw. However, it was later announced that Sandhagen would face John Lineker at the event instead. On January 10, Lineker was forced to withdraw from the bout due to a rib injury. He was replaced by promotional newcomer Mario Bautista. He won the bout via first round submission.

The bout with Lineker was rescheduled and eventually took place on April 27, 2019 at UFC Fight Night: Jacaré vs. Hermansson. Sandhagen won the fight via split decision.

Sandhagen faced Raphael Assunção on August 17, 2019 at UFC 241. He won the bout by unanimous decision.

Sandhagen was scheduled to face Frankie Edgar in a bantamweight bout on January 25, 2020 at UFC Fight Night 166. However, Edgar was removed from the fight in favour of a bout against Chan Sung Jung a month earlier at UFC Fight Night 165. In turn, Sandhagen was removed from the card.

Sandhagen faced Aljamain Sterling on June 6, 2020 at UFC 250 in a bout that UFC president Dana White confirmed to be a bantamweight title eliminator. He lost the bout via submission in the first round.

Sandhagen faced Marlon Moraes on October 11, 2020 at UFC Fight Night 179 in the main event. Sandhagen won the fight via technical knockout in round two. This win earned him the Performance of the Night award.

Sandhagen faced Frankie Edgar at UFC Fight Night 184 on February 6, 2021. He won the fight via knockout by flying knee in the first round. This win earned him the Performance of the Night award.

Sandhagen was scheduled to face T.J. Dillashaw on May 8, 2021 at UFC on ESPN 24. However, Dillashaw announced on April 27 that he had to pull out of the fight due to a cut he received from a headbutt in training. The pairing remained intact and was rescheduled to headline UFC on ESPN: Sandhagen vs. Dillashaw on July 24, 2021.  He lost a close fight via split decision. 17 out of 23 media outlets scored the bout as a win for Sandhagen.

Sandhagen faced Petr Yan for the Interim UFC Bantamweight Championship at UFC 267 on October 30, 2021. Sandhagen served as a late replacement for Aljamain Sterling, who was forced to withdraw from the bout with Yan due to a neck injury. He lost the bout via unanimous decision. This bout earned the Fight of the Night award.

Sandhagen faced Song Yadong on September 17, 2022 at UFC Fight Night 210. He won the fight via technical knockout after the doctor stopped the fight due to a cut.

Sandhagen was scheduled to face Marlon Vera on February 18, 2023 at UFC Fight Night 219. However, the bout was moved to UFC on ESPN 43 for unknown reasons.

Personal life
Apart from his mixed martial arts career, Sandhagen worked part-time at a trauma center for children and teaches mixed martial arts at High Altitude Martial Arts in Aurora, Colorado.

Championships and achievements
Ultimate Fighting Championship
Fight of the Night (Two times) 
Performance of the Night (Two times) 
MMAjunkie.com
2021 February Knockout of the Month  vs. Frankie Edgar 
2021 July Fight of the Month 
Cageside Press
2021 Knockout of the Year vs. Frankie Edgar
Combat Press
2021 Knockout of the Year vs. Frankie Edgar

Mixed martial arts record

|-
|Win
|align=center|15–4
|Song Yadong
|TKO (doctor stoppage)
|UFC Fight Night: Sandhagen vs. Song 
|
|align=center|4
|align=center|5:00
|Las Vegas, Nevada, United States
|
|-
|Loss
|align=center|14–4
|Petr Yan 
|Decision (unanimous)
|UFC 267 
|
|align=center|5
|align=center|5:00
|Abu Dhabi, United Arab Emirates
|
|-
|Loss
|align=center|14–3
|T.J. Dillashaw
|Decision (split)
|UFC on ESPN: Sandhagen vs. Dillashaw
|
|align=center|5
|align=center|5:00
|Las Vegas, Nevada, United States
|
|-
|Win
|align=center|14–2
|Frankie Edgar
|KO (flying knee)
|UFC Fight Night: Overeem vs. Volkov
|
|align=center|1
|align=center|0:28
|Las Vegas, Nevada, United States
|
|-
|Win
|align=center|13–2
|Marlon Moraes
|TKO (spinning wheel kick and punches)
|UFC Fight Night: Moraes vs. Sandhagen
|
|align=center|2
|align=center|1:03
|Abu Dhabi, United Arab Emirates
|
|-
|Loss
|align=center|12–2
|Aljamain Sterling
|Submission (rear-naked choke)
|UFC 250
|
|align=center|1
|align=center|1:28
|Las Vegas, Nevada, United States
|
|-
|Win
|align=center|12–1
|Raphael Assunção
|Decision (unanimous)
|UFC 241 
|
|align=center|3
|align=center|5:00
|Anaheim, California, United States
|
|-
|Win
|align=center|11–1
|John Lineker
|Decision (split)
|UFC Fight Night: Jacaré vs. Hermansson 
|
|align=center|3
|align=center|5:00
|Sunrise, Florida, United States
|
|-
| Win
| align=center| 10–1
| Mario Bautista
| Submission (armbar)
| UFC Fight Night: Cejudo vs. Dillashaw
| 
| align=center| 1
| align=center| 3:31
| Brooklyn, New York, United States
| 
|-
| Win
| align=center| 9–1
| Iuri Alcântara
| TKO (punches)
| UFC Fight Night: Gaethje vs. Vick
| 
| align=center| 2
| align=center| 1:01
| Lincoln, Nebraska, United States
|
|-
| Win
| align=center| 8–1
| Austin Arnett
| TKO (punches)
| UFC on Fox: Jacaré vs. Brunson 2
| 
| align=center| 2
| align=center| 3:48
| Charlotte, North Carolina, United States
| 
|-
| Win
| align=center| 7–1
| José Aguayo
| TKO (knee and elbows)
| LFA 31
| 
| align=center| 1
| align=center| 1:07
| Phoenix, Arizona, United States
| 
|-
| Win
| align=center| 6–1
| Luiz Antônio Lobo Gavinho
| TKO (punches)
| LFA 24
| 
| align=center| 1
| align=center| 3:00
| Phoenix, Arizona, United States
| 
|-
| Loss
| align=center| 5–1
| Jamall Emmers
| Decision (unanimous)
| LFA 5
| 
| align=center| 3
| align=center| 5:00
| Broomfield, Colorado, United States
| 
|-
| Win
| align=center| 5–0
| Clay Wimer
| Decision (unanimous)
| RFA 43
| 
| align=center| 3
| align=center| 5:00
| Broomfield, Colorado, United States
| 
|-
| Win
| align=center| 4–0
| Josh Huber
| Decision (unanimous)
| Sparta Combat League 50
| 
| align=center| 3
| align=center| 5:00
| Castle Rock, Colorado, United States
|
|-
| Win
| align=center| 3–0
| Dalton Goddard
| Submission (triangle choke)
| Paramount MMA 2016
| 
| align=center| 1
| align=center| 3:38
| Denver, Colorado, United States
| 
|-
| Win
| align=center| 2–0
| Andrew Tenneson
| Decision (unanimous) 
| RFA 34
| 
| align=center| 3
| align=center| 5:00
| Broomfield, Colorado, United States
|
|-
| Win
| align=center| 1–0
| Bruce Sessman
| Submission (rear-naked choke)
| FTW: Prize Fighting Championship 9
| 
| align=center| 1
| align=center| 1:16
| Williston, North Dakota, United States
|
|-

See also
 List of current UFC fighters
 List of male mixed martial artists

References

External links
 

American male mixed martial artists
1992 births
Living people
Bantamweight mixed martial artists
Featherweight mixed martial artists
Mixed martial artists utilizing boxing
Mixed martial artists utilizing kickboxing
Mixed martial artists utilizing Brazilian jiu-jitsu
Mixed martial artists from Colorado
Ultimate Fighting Championship male fighters
American practitioners of Brazilian jiu-jitsu
Sportspeople from Aurora, Colorado
University of Colorado Boulder alumni